Shuklagandaki is a municipality located in Tanahu District of Gandaki Province in the Western Development Region, Nepal. The municipality was formed on 18 May 2014. It was formed by merging three Village Development Committees: Dhorphirdi, Dulegaunda and Khairenitar. And further more Thaprek, Raipur and Phirphire VDC are merged on 5 March 2017.

This municipality has a high religious value. Dhorbarahi, one of the most famous goddess temples, is located in just a few kilometers far away from Dhorphirdi.  Several small famous Hindu temples are located in this municipality. Along with the temples, it also has a Church and a Mosque.

Prithvi Highway goes through this Municipality. Several small roadways are connected to the main cities like Dulegaunda, Khairenitar, Kotre, etc.

At the time of 2011 Nepal Census, it had a population of 37,109. After addition of Thaprek, Raipur and Phirphire VDCs on 5 March 2017 population of Shuklagandaki Municipality 45456 as of 2011 census

Demographics
At the time of the 2011 Nepal census, Shuklagandaki Municipality had a population of 49,611. Of these, 74.2% spoke Nepali, 10.4% Gurung, 8.9% Magar, 2.7% Newar, 1.2% Urdu, 0.4% Bhojpuri, 0.4% Kumhali, 0.3% Kham, 0.3% Tamang, 0.2% Hindi, 0.2% Rai, 0.2% Tharu, 0.1% Lhoba, 0.1% Thakali and 0.1% other languages as their first language.

In terms of ethnicity/caste, 18.0% were Magar, 17.9% Hill Brahmin, 13.5% Gurung, 12.4% Chhetri, 10.3% Kami, 6.6% Newar, 3.5% Damai/Dholi, 3.4% Kumal, 3.3% Thakuri, 2.8% Gharti/Bhujel, 2.5% Sarki, 1.7% Musalman, 0.8% Tamang, 0.7% Sanyasi/Dasnami, 0.6% Rai, 0.3% other Dalit, 0.2% Badi, 0.2% Sunuwar, 0.2% Tharu, 0.2% Yadav, 0.1% Lhoba, 0.1% Thakali and 0.2% others.

In terms of religion, 84.4% were Hindu, 9.9% Buddhist, 2.1% Bon, 1.7% Muslim, 1.3% Christianity, 0.2% Prakriti and 0.4% others.

In terms of literacy, 78.8% could read and write, 1.5% could only read and 19.7% could neither read nor write.

Temples in Shuklagandaki
Dhorbarahi Temple

Educational Institutions in Shuklagandaki Municipality
Bhanubhakta Multiple Campius  (Bachelor to Master) (Affiliated to Tribhuvan University) (Operated by government of Nepal)
Sahid Karishna Collage (Government)
Panchamunidev Secondary School (Basic to +2 Level) (Operated by government of Nepal)
Gaufarkodaya Secondary School (Operated by government of Nepal)
Little Garden English Boarding School (Private School) (Basic to SEE)
Araniko English Boarding Secondary School (Private School) (Basic to +2 Level)
Chhabdi deuralai Secondary School.

References

External links
UN map of the municipalities of Tanahu District

Populated places in Tanahun District
Municipalities in Gandaki Province
Nepal municipalities established in 2014